A feasibility study is a process that defines exactly what a project is and what strategic issues need to be considered to assess its feasibility, or likelihood of succeeding.

Feasibility study may also refer to:
 Feasibility study, an evaluation and analysis of the potential of a proposed project
 "A Feasibility Study", a 1964 episode of The Outer Limits
 "Feasibility Study" (The Outer Limits), a 1997 remake of the above episode
 Mining feasibility study, an evaluation of a proposed mining project to determine whether the mineral resource can be mined economically
 Severn Tidal Power Feasibility Study, a UK Government feasibility study into a tidal power project